The Council of Irish Guiding Associations is the national Guiding federation of the Republic of Ireland. Guiding in Ireland started in 1911, and Ireland became a member of the World Association of Girl Guides and Girl Scouts (WAGGGS) in 1932. The council serves 13,837 Guides (as of 2008).

History 
The Irish Girl Guides (GGI) became a member of WAGGGS in 1932. About the same time, the first independent companies of Catholic Guides were founded in Ireland. When the diocese based Catholic Guide organizations formed the federation of the Catholic Girl Guides of Ireland (CGI) in 1972, the new organization expressed the wish of joining WAGGGS. After nearly twenty years of negotiations, both organizations agreed to establish the Council of Irish Guiding Associations in 1992. The Council was recognised as a full member of WAGGGS in July 1993 during the 28th WAGGGS World Conference as continuing the membership gained by the Irish Girl Guides in 1932.

Since WAGGGS accepts only one member organization per country, members of CGI living in Northern Ireland were not members of WAGGGS until 2008 when an agreement was signed by CGI and Girlguiding UK on the representation of CGI members resident in Northern Ireland.

Aims 
The aims of CIGA are to
 enable membership of WAGGGS to be held by the Irish Girl Guides and the Catholic Guides of Ireland on behalf of their members resident in the Republic of Ireland;
 promote and further the objects of the World Association as expressed in Article 111 of the Constitution and Bye-Laws of WAGGGS;
 encourage strong dialogue and close cooperation amongst the family of Guiding in the whole of Ireland;
 facilitate participation at international events and activities
 work towards a single movement.

Structures 
Members of the council are
 Irish Girl Guides 
 Catholic Guides of Ireland
CIGA's committee consists of eight members, four for each organization. Additionally, there are four observers representing Guiding in Northern Ireland, two from CGI and two from Girlguiding Ulster. The committee's chairmanship rotates biennially between the two organizations.

See also
Scouting Ireland

References

World Association of Girl Guides and Girl Scouts member organizations
Scouting and Guiding in Ireland
Youth organizations established in 1992